The British Academy Television Award for Best Female Comedy Performance was instituted in 2009. It is awarded by the British Academy of Film and Television Arts (BAFTA), a British organisation that hosts annual awards shows for film, television, children's film and television, and interactive media.

Since 2009 (presented in 2010), the British Academy Television Awards has presented two awards for comedy performance, the BAFTA TV Award for Best Female Comedy Performance and the BAFTA TV Award for Best Male Comedy Performance. Before 2009 there was one award for Best Comedy Performance. Jessica Hynes is the only actress who has received this award more than once, with two wins.

Winners and nominees

2010s

2020s

Superlatives

Actresses with multiple wins and nominations

Multiple wins
The following people have won the British Academy Television Award for Best Female Comedy Performance multiple times:

2 wins
Jessica Hynes

Multiple nominations
The following people have been nominated for the British Academy Television Award for Best Female Comedy Performance multiple times:

4 nominations
Olivia Colman
Miranda Hart

3 nominations
Daisy May Cooper
Jessica Hynes

2 nominations
Jo Brand
Julia Davis
Sian Gibson
Tamsin Greig
Sharon Horgan
Gbemisola Ikumelo
Lesley Manville
Katherine Parkinson
Phoebe Waller-Bridge
Aimee Lou Wood

Programmes with multiple wins and nominations

Multiple Nominations

4 nominations
Fleabag
Miranda

3 nominations
Getting On
Sex Education
This Country
Twenty Twelve

2 nominations
Catastrophe
Famalam
Mum
Peter Kay's Car Share
The IT Crowd

References

External links
 BAFTA official site
 BAFTA Awards, Internet Movie Database

Female Comedy Performance